Merhawi Goitom (born 8 February 1996) is an Eritrean racing cyclist.

Major results
2016
 1st  Overall Tour of Eritrea
1st  Young rider classification
1st Stage 3
 6th Fenkil Northern Red Sea Challenge

References

1996 births
Living people
Eritrean male cyclists
21st-century Eritrean people